The Maryland state elections of 2006 decided who will serve in hundreds of political offices throughout the state of Maryland in the United States.  The primary elections were held on September 12, 2006, and the general election was held on November 7, 2006.

Federal-level elections
United States Senate election
United States House of Representatives elections

State-level elections
Gubernatorial election
Attorney General election
Comptroller election
House of Delegates elections
Senate elections

Local-level elections
County executive elections
County offices elections

References
 Primary election results
 General election results

 
Maryland